The Center for Devices and Radiological Health (CDRH) is the branch of the United States Food and Drug Administration (FDA) responsible for the premarket approval of all medical devices, as well as overseeing the manufacturing, performance and safety of these devices. The CDRH also oversees the radiation safety performance of non-medical devices which emit certain types of electromagnetic radiation, such as cellular phones and microwave ovens.

The current head of the CDRH is Jeffrey Shuren, who took over in January 2010.

Regulatory classes
CDRH splits medical devices into three classes with different regulatory requirements:

Class 1 devices include everyday items such as toothbrushes which are unlikely to cause serious consequences if they fail.  Manufacturers are required to follow what are called "general controls" which closely match ISO 9000 requirements.

In addition to the general controls, Class 2 devices require a premarket notification. This process, commonly known as the "510(k)" process after the relevant section of the Food, Drug and Cosmetic Act, results in FDA clearance of a product. The intent of this class was for new manufacturers of devices that already existed when the rules were established.  A Class 2 device is required to be "substantially equivalent" to existing devices. The class is now used for "medium risk" devices such as demineralized bone powder used for reconstructive surgery, which is officially substantially equivalent to Plaster of Paris, a much older product that was used for the same purpose. This equivalence is used when the FDA does not think a full approval process with extensive clinical trials is necessary.

The premarket notification process came under fire in February 2011 after the release of a study by Dr. Diana Zuckerman and Paul Brown of the National Center for Health Research, and Dr. Steven Nissen of the Cleveland Clinic, published in the Archives of Internal Medicine, showed that most medical devices recalled in the last five years for "serious health problems or death" had been previously approved by the FDA using the less stringent, cheaper 510(k) process. In a few cases, the devices had been deemed so low-risk that they did not undergo any FDA regulatory review. Of the 113 devices recalled during the 5 year period, 35 were for cardiovascular issues.  This study was the topic of Congressional hearings re-evaluating FDA procedures and oversight.

A study by Dr. Stephanie Fox-Rawlings and colleagues at the National Center for Health Research, published in 2018 in the policy journal Milbank Quarterly, investigated whether studies reviewed by the FDA for high-risk medical devices are proven safe and effective for women, racial or ethnic minorities, or patients over 65 years of age. The law encourages patient diversity in clinical trials submitted to the FDA for review, but does not require it. The study determined that most high-risk medical devices are not tested and analyzed to ensure that they are safe and effective for all major demographic groups, particularly racial and ethnic minorities and people over 65. Therefore, they do not provide information about safety or effectiveness that would help patients and physicians make well informed decisions.

Class 3 devices require a "Pre-market Approval" (PMA), which is analogous to the drug approval process with clinical trials and extensive review of the design. Class 3 devices tend to be products such as pacemakers which would cause obvious risk of injury or death if they did not function properly.  As with all devices, the manufacturers must follow the general controls.

History
CDRH's earliest predecessor was the Radiological Health Unit within the U.S. Public Health Service (PHS) Bureau of State Services, which was established in 1948.  As part of the PHS reorganizations of 1966–1973, it became the Bureau of Radiological Health within the Environmental Control Administration in 1968.  When the Environmental Control Administration was transformed into the Environmental Protection Agency in 1971, the Bureau of Radiological Health's personnel and facilities were split, with portions of it transferred to EPA, while the remainder became part of the FDA.

The Bureau of Medical Devices was established within FDA in 1973, and merged with the Bureau of Radiological Health in 1982 to form the Center for Devices and Radiological Health. The merge was the result of the beginning of the biotechnology revolution blurring the lines between drugs, biologics, and medical devices, leading to Commissioner Arthur Hayes reorganizing the FDA to merge the bureaus responsible for medical devices and radiation control into their present form.

John Villforth served as director of the Bureau of Radiological Health and then the merged center from 1969 until 1990.

References

External links
CDRH official government website
Medical Devices
Radiation-Emitting Products

Food and Drug Administration
Laser safety and standards